The Romulan Way is a science fiction novel written by Diane Duane and Peter Morwood. It is the second novel in the Rihannsu series, in turn part of the Star Trek: The Original Series saga.

Plot
Deep-cover Federation spy Agent Terise LoBrutto has her carefully maintained life disrupted by an unpleasant discovery. The chief medical officer of the USS Enterprise, Dr. McCoy, has been captured. It's up to LoBrutto to rescue McCoy.

References

External links

Novels based on Star Trek: The Original Series
1987 American novels
American science fiction novels